Mark Porter (born 15 March 1960, Aberdeen, Scotland) is a British publication designer and art director, and former creative director of The Guardian. Formerly he was the art director of the Evening Standard, the UK edition of Wired, and Colors. He directed the redesign of The Guardian, which was voted best-designed newspaper in the world by the US-based Society for News Design in 2006.

References

Scottish designers
Living people
1960 births
People from Aberdeen